Four Mile Creek State Park is a  state park located in the Town of Porter in Niagara County, New York.

Description
The park offers picnic tables, a playground, hiking and biking, a campground with tent and trailer sites, yurts, laundry facilities, recreation programs, a nature trail, and a food concession. Camping permits issued by the park allow for free parking at other state parks located in the area. Wildlife at the park includes great blue herons and white-tailed deer.

See also
 List of New York state parks

References

External links
 New York State Parks: Four Mile Creek State Park

State parks of New York (state)
Robert Moses projects
Parks in Niagara County, New York
Rivers of Niagara County, New York